Street vendors have existed in Los Angeles since California became a state. They have mostly been poorer Latin American and Chinese immigrants.

History 

Street vending became prominent in the latter half of the 19th century, after California became a state in 1850. Mexican and Chinese immigrants were some of the first street vendors in 1870. By 1890, the city tried to restrict their movement, but the food proved to be too popular.

They continued to try to outlaw tamale carts into the next century. 

Most street vendors at the time stayed in downtown LA, but with the rise of the automobile they were able to spread out more. Tacos from street carts became big in the 1930s.

Chinese immigrants had a harder time because they were trapped in ghettos and attacks kept their population to just a few hundred. They were forced to migrate around the city and go up to people’s doors. Public health officials told people that their food was unsanitary and to not eat it. In the 1920s, Olvera Street was revitalized and Chinese street vending disappeared, along with Chinatown being moved farther away.

By the time of the Olympics in 1932 most of the street vendors had been run off. 

In 1994, councilman Mike Hernandez took over an initiative to allow street vending in MacArthur Park, Westlake, and Pico Union. Other council members worried that it would scare away brick and mortar businesses. To help assuage those fears they said that since more people would be on the street they would be able to tell police about crimes.

In 1999, the Institute For Urban Research and Development was asked to manage the vending district in MacArthur Park. Right away there were several problems. Vendors were limited in where they could sell, meaning that they couldn’t follow crowds. They were also limited in what they could sell, meaning people didn’t want to participate in the program.

The current movement to legalize street vending has been heavily influenced by actual street vendors.

Four groups came together to fight for street vending to be legalized and created the Legalize Street Vending Campaign. Each group was able to contribute something different. The East LA Community Corporation helps to develop communities. The Los Angeles Food Policy Council looked at how legalizing street vending could help people gain access to healthy food. Public Council is a public interest law firm and is non-profit. The Leadership for Urban Renewal Network advocates for low-income communities and their economic development. Street vendors were quickly brought in to lead and advocate for street vending to be legalized. 

In 2012, they went to council members to find allies and help draft a policy proposal. The report was not considered a priority until the 2016 election.

When Trump announced a deportation priority for anyone who’s committed a crime it was enough pressure for the council to vote in February 2017 to decriminalize it.

The city pushed back against full legalization. They implemented two-vendor per block caps and allowed store owners to keep people from selling in front of their store. Certain sections of the city were also restricted. No one could sell on the Hollywood Walk Of Fame, meaning people lost a huge source of income.

After it became legalized they were still restricted from selling in Hollywood, but Legalize Street Vending Campaign continues to fight for venders to be able to sell with unique rules instead of being completely banned.

For decades, street vending has been prominent throughout the history of Los Angeles and has played a significant role in the culture and economic growth of Los Angeles. Considering LA has a large Hispanic population, a large portion of street vendors today and in the past are, or were, of Mexican descent. Today there are over 50,000 different kinds of street vendors in LA; 10,000 of them selling food. It is often the first profession of immigrants in the city.

The street vending micro-enterprises make up a $504 million industry. It has been estimated that over 5,000 jobs have been created by these street vendors and those they deal with.

Laws 
In 2016, the city of Los Angeles decriminalized street vending.

In November 2018, the city voted unanimously to legalize it.

In September 2018, California Governor Jerry Brown signed the Safe Sidewalk Vending Act, or SB 946, which decriminalized street vending in throughout the state. SB 946 limits violations and fines imposed on said vendors.

Under these new laws, vendors will be required to have business licenses and health food permits. According to the rules, this is to keep merchants from “impeding with the flow of pedestrian activity” and require them to maintain “a clean area around their carts” according to Councilman Curran Price.

Street vendors are prohibited from vending in specific areas such as the Hollywood Walk of Fame, Universal Studios, El Pueblo de Los Angeles, Staples Center, Dodger Stadium, the Hollywood Bowl, the Coliseum, and Banc of California Stadium on event days.

References

Further reading 

Street vendors
Economy of Los Angeles
Culture of Los Angeles
Food and drink in California